Saint Walburg, St. Walburg or variant, may refer to:
 the saint, Saint Walpurga
 St. Walburg, Saskatchewan, a town in Canada
 Santa Valburga, a subdivision of Ulten, Italy

See also
 Walburg (disambiguation)